Elisabeth Maria Beskow (19November 187017October 1928) was a Swedish author. Born in Stockholm, Sweden she went to the Beskow School and later studied at the Sabbatsberg Hospital as well as the Sophiahemmet. She wrote about fifty books under the pseudonym Runa. A number of her books are translated into Danish, Finnish, French, English, German and Dutch.

In her books she discussed the equal rights of men and women and spoke against animal testing and for vegetarianism.

Bibliography—a selection 
 Allt eller intet (1895)
 Från skogarna och fjällen (Beijer, 1896)
 På Elghyttan (Fosterlandsstift, 1902)
 Nina (Fosterlandsstift, 1903)
 Var rädd om din krona! (Stockholm Fosterlandsstift : Barnaserien, 1903)
 Gamle prästen i Hornsjö och andra berättelser (Fosterlandsstiftelsen, 1904)
 Sagor och berättelser för barn (Palmquist, 1904)
 Med blicken mot det osynliga (Fosterlandsstift., 1906)
 Katri berättelse (Fosterlandsstiftelsen, 1907, Bibliotek för de unga. Ungdomsserien ; 6)
 Röster (A. V. Carlson, 1909)
 Den ljusnande framtid (Fosterlandsstift, 1910, Bibliotek för de unga. Ungdomsserien ; 9)
 Vildfågel (A. V. Carlson, 1911)
 I vildmarken och andra berättelser från Lappland (A. V. Carlson, 1911)
 Korsfararne, handling i dramatisk form, (A. V. Carlson, 1912)
 Ljudande malm (Rock Island, Ill. : Augustana Book Concern, [1912?])
 Vildfågels näste (A. V. Carlson, 1913)
 En tonskapelse berättelse (A. V. Carlson, 1913)
 Han och hans hustru (A. V. Carlson, 1915)
 Grannarna i Västanfors (A. V. Carlson, 1916)
 Sif (Carlson, 1917)
 Lärobok i stenografi (Gumperts bokh. i distr., 1917)
 Birger Löwing (A. V. Carlson, 1918)
 Hans moders gud (A. V. Carlson, 1914)
 Birger Löwing (A. V. Carlson, 1918)
 Den lille väpnaren, sagor och berättelser för barn 2:a uppl, (Lindblad, 1919)
 Fostersyskonen (Stockholm, 1922)
 Hans ögons ljus (A. V. Carlson, 1923
 Ekekronas (A. V. Carlson, 1924)
 Fader och son (A. V. Carlson, 1925)
 Gossar och flickor (Lindblad, 1925)
 Ols Barbro (A. V. Carlson, 1921)
 Skalunga I och II (Carlson 1919–25)
 Skiftande dagrar berättelser (Lindblad, 1926)
 Trettonåringar (A. V. Carlson, 1926)
 Testamentet (A. V. Carlson, 1927)
 Vårdrömmar (Uppsala, 1927)
 Förnyelse, (A. V. Carlson, 1928)
 Vardagsliv

References

Further reading

External links 
Han och hans hustru
Vårdrömmar

1870 births
1928 deaths
20th-century Swedish activists
Swedish women activists
Swedish feminists
Swedish non-fiction writers
Swedish women non-fiction writers